Judge Hall may refer to:

Cynthia Holcomb Hall (1929–2011), judge of the United States Court of Appeals for the Ninth Circuit
Dominic Augustin Hall (1765–1820), judge of the United States Circuit Court for the Fifth Circuit
James Randal Hall (born 1958), judge of the United States District Court for the Southern District of Georgia
Janet C. Hall (born 1948), judge of the United States District Court for the District of Connecticut
Kenneth Keller Hall (1918–1999), judge of the United States Court of Appeals for the Fourth Circuit
LaShann DeArcy Hall (born 1970), judge of the United States District Court for the Eastern District of New York
Maxwell Hall (1884–1966), British colonial judge
Nathan K. Hall (1810–1874), judge of the United States District Court for the Northern District of New York
Peirson Mitchell Hall (1894–1979), judge of the United States District Courts for the Southern and Central Districts of California
Peter W. Hall (1948–2021), judge of the United States Court of Appeals for the Second Circuit
Robert Howell Hall (1921–1995), judge of the United States District Court for the Northern District of Georgia
Sam B. Hall Jr. (1924–1994), judge of the United States District Court for the Eastern District of Texas
Willard Hall (1780–1875), judge of the United States District Court for the District of Delaware

See also
Justice Hall (disambiguation)